Lomnice is a market town in Brno-Country District in the South Moravian Region of the Czech Republic. It has about 1,500 inhabitants. The historic town centre is well preserved and is protected by law as an urban monument zone.

Administrative parts
Villages of Brusná, Řepka and Veselí are administrative parts of Lomnice.

Geography
It is located in the Upper Svratka Highlands. The built-up area lies above the stream Besének, which flows across the municipal territory.

History

The first written mention of Lomnice is from 1265 or 1281. A church consecrated to Saints John the Baptist and Vitus was mentioned here in 1407. In the 15th century, the settlement developed and in 1502, it was first referred to as a market town. Until 1570, Lomnice was ruled by the Lords of Lomnice.

Lomnice was inherited by the House of Zierotin, who had rebuilt the Gothic castle from the 13th century into a Renaissance residence. In In 1571, the Jewish population in Lomnice was first documented. After the manor changed hands several times in the following decades, it was bought by Count Gabriel Serényi in 1662. His son František Gabriel Serényi reorganized the economy, had completely rebuilt the castle in the Baroque style, had a new planned urban concept laid down, and had a new large church and the town hall built. The Serényi family owned Lomnice until the abolishment of manorialism. Properties of the Serényi family were confiscated in 1945.

Sights

Church of the Visitation of Our Lady is an early Baroque building from 1669–1683. It is an architectonically valuable example of the Baroque style in Moravia.

The town hall is the second landmark of the square. It was built between 1669 and 1680. It has an advanced prismatic tower. In the middle of the town square is a Marian column from 1709.

The castle in inaccessible to the public. It is surrounded by a castle forest, which is protected as a nature monument. The forest contains a unique neo-Gothic gazebo from the 19th century.

The synagogue was built in 1792–1794. Today it serves cultural and educational purposes.

Notable people
Leo Eitinger (1912–1996), Norwegian psychiatrist and author

References

External links

Populated places in Brno-Country District
Market towns in the Czech Republic